Jesse Jackson (born 1941) is an American civil rights activist and minister.

Jesse Jackson may also refer to:

Jesse Jackson Jr. (born 1965), United States Congressman
Jesse B. Jackson (1871–1947), United States consul
Jesse C. Jackson (1908-1983), United States novelist

See also
Jessie Jackson (Coronation Street), fictional character
Jesse Jackson House, a historic home in North Carolina